Cabart is a French brand of musical wind instruments. As an independent brand, it was declined by the names Thibouville-Cabart and Cabart a Paris.  The name was bought out by F. Lorée in 1974 to name its range of student-level oboes: Cabart 74 and Cabart.

Brand origins 
The Thibouville family is from La Couture-Boussey (Eure, France). From the early nineteenth century, its members would create about two dozen musical instruments brands with the name Thibouville. Jean-Baptiste Thibouville, born May 4, 1832, in La Couture-Boussey, was the inheritor of the brand Thibouville-Herouard (his parents' names) founded in 1842. First, He created two companies in Paris, which only last a short time because of the death of his associates. In 1867, he married Rose Leonie Cabart, daughter of Jean Michel Cabart, owner and comb manufacturer in Ezy-sur-Eure (Eure, France). In 1869, he established in Ezy-sur-Eure the Thibouville-Cabart factory.

Factory's life from 1869 to 1977 
 1878: Paris World's Fair (Wind instrument category - Bronze medal).
 1889: Paris World's Fair (Wind instrument category - Silver medal).
 1880-1890s: Louis Bas (1863–1944, 1st oboist at the Opera of Paris and at the Société des concerts, and J.-B. Thibouville's son-in-law), holds the shop in Paris. He makes research to improve oboes and bassoons. 
It is from these years that the name Cabart a Paris is used for high quality instruments, other instruments are stamped Thibouville-Cabart a Paris.
 1897: Death of Jean-Baptiste Thibouville, his wife takes charge of the factory.
In the following decade, Paul Thiberville (1874–1949), another son-in-law, gradually takes the leadership of the company.
 1948 : André Lhéridat and Marcel Lefèvre buy out the company.
 1971-1977: Liquidation of the company. F. Lorée buys Cabart name for its student oboes in 1974.

Instruments 
Mostly oboe, but also bassoon (German bassoon from the 1940s), contrabassoon, clarinet, flute, saxophone and English horn.

Locations 
 in Ezy-sur-Eure : in 1877, buildings bought « Rue Grande » (now Place Félix Hulin). Installation of a steam engine about 1880.
From 1948 to 1950, major expansion, all stages of production now taking place there.
 in Paris : 35 rue Notre-Dame-de-Nazareth (attested in 1867, 1878), 15 boulevard Saint-Martin (1896), 22 rue Meslay (1901), 11 rue de Castellane (1905) and 34 rue laborde (1909, 1913). No longer address in Paris in subsequent documents (1928, etc.).

References

Sources

Original Sources
 Etat civil, Archives départementales de l'Eure.
 Constant Pierre, « Les facteurs d'instruments de musique », Paris, 1893.
 M. de Pontécoulant, « La musique à l'exposition universelle de 1867 », Paris, 1868.
 Chouquet, "Rapport sur les instruments de musiques à l'exposition universelle de 1878", Paris, 1878.
 « Annuaire des artistes et de l'enseignement dramatique et musical », Paris, 1896, p. 380.
 « Annuaire des artistes et de l'enseignement dramatique et musical », Paris, 1909, p. 337 et p. 678.
 « Annuaire français de la facture instrumentale et de l'édition musicale », Paris, 1913.

Studies
 François Camboulive, brochure « Thibouville-Cabart Ezy-sur-Eure », archives départementales de l'Eure.
 William Waterhouse, « New Langwill Index ».

Oboe manufacturing companies
Musical instrument manufacturing companies of France